Elections in Sarawak have been held in the Malaysian state of Sarawak since 1959 and have chosen Sarawak's elected representatives in the Dewan Rakyat and Dewan Undangan Negeri (the Malaysian federal and state assemblies).

Federal level

Federal constituencies
 List of former Malaysian federal electoral districts#Sarawak
 List of Malaysian electoral districts#Sarawak

General elections

1969 general election

1974 general election

1978 general election

1982 general election

1986 general election

1990 general election

1995 general election

1999 general election

2004 general election

2008 general election

2013 general election

2018 general election

2022 general election

State level

State constituencies
 List of former Malaysian state electoral districts#Sarawak

District council elections

1959 district council election

1963 district council election

State elections

1969 state election

1974 state election

1979 state election

1983 state election

1987 state election

1991 state election

1996 state election

2001 state election

2006 state election

2011 state election

2016 state election

2021 state election

 
Elections in Malaysia